Senior Year may refer to:

 Senior (education), the final year in high school or college
 Senior Year (2010 film), the 2010 film by Filipino director Jerrold Tarog
Senior Year (2022 film), a film starring Rebel Wilson
 The Lockheed U-2

See also
 Senioritis
 12th Grade